Fourteenth United States Army was a fictitious/military deception field army, under the command of John P. Lucas, developed under Operation Quicksilver as a part of the fictitious First United States Army Group.

Alleged composition
As part of a psychological warfare campaign the Fourteenth Army was described by Agent Garbo in a message sent to German intelligence around 24 August 1944 claiming that his source in the ETO Services of Supply, who had a relative in the US 48th Infantry Division had advised him of:

...a lot of curious things about the basis of the composition of this Fourteenth US Army; amongst them he said that in their ranks there were many convicts who were released from prisons in the United States to be enrolled in a foreign legion of the French or Spanish type. It can almost be said that there are brigades composed of gangsters and bloodthirsty men, specially selected to fight against the Japanese, men who are not supposed to take prisoners, but instead to administer a cruel justice at their own hands.

Order of battle
What follows is the order of battle for the Fourteenth Army at one point during Operation Fortitude. The various formations changed as the operation continued in order to mislead Axis intelligence.

  US 14th Army (Fictional—Little Waltham)
  9th Airborne Division (Fictional—Leicester)
  21st Airborne Division (Fictional—Fulbeck)
  XXXIII Corps (Fictional—HQ Bury St Edmonds)
  11th Infantry Division (Fictional—Bury St Edmonds)
  48th Infantry Division (Fictional—Woodbridge)
  25th Armored Division (Fictional—East Dereham)
 XXXVII Corps (Fictional—HQ Chelmsford)
  17th Infantry Division (Fictional—Hatfield & Peverel)
  59th Infantry Division (Fictional—Ipswich)

References

Bibliography
 
 

014 Army
14 Army